Ireland participated in the Eurovision Song Contest 2022 in Turin, Italy with the song "That's Rich" performed by Brooke. The Irish broadcaster  (RTÉ) organised the national final Eurosong 2022 in order to select the Irish entry for the 2022 contest. Six songs faced the votes of a studio jury, an international jury and a public televote which determined the final selection.

Ireland was drawn to compete in the second semi-final of the Eurovision Song Contest which took place on 12 May 2022. Performing during the show in position 10, "That's Rich" was not announced among the top 10 entries of the second semi-final and therefore did not qualify to compete in the final. It was later revealed that Ireland placed 15th out of the 18 participating countries in the semi-final with 47 points.

Background 

Ireland has won the contest a record seven times in total.

The Irish national broadcaster,  (RTÉ), broadcasts the event within Ireland and organises the selection process for the nation's entry. RTÉ confirmed their intentions to participate at the 2022 Eurovision Song Contest on 6 September 2021. From 2016 to 2021, RTÉ held an internal selection to choose the artist and song to represent Ireland at the contest. For the 2022 Eurovision Song Contest, RTÉ announced on 16 September 2021 the organisation of the national final Eurosong 2022 to choose the artist and song to represent Ireland at the contest. This marked the first time since 2015 that RTÉ had set up a national final to select both the artist and song for the contest.

Before Eurovision

Eurosong 2022 
Eurosong 2022 was the national final format developed by RTÉ in order to select Ireland's entry for the Eurovision Song Contest 2022. The competition was broadcast during a special edition of The Late Late Show. The winner was chosen by a combination of a professional national studio jury, an international jury and televote vote.

Competing entries 
On 16 September 2021, RTÉ opened a submission period where artists and composers were able to submit their entries for the competition until 22 October 2021. At the closing of the deadline, 320 entries were received. The competing entries were selected through two phases involving two separate jury panels with members appointed by RTÉ; the first phase involved a twelve-member jury panel reviewing all of the submissions and shortlisting 20 to 30 entries, while the second phase involved an alternate jury selecting the six finalists. The finalists were presented between 17 and 21 January 2022 on The Ryan Tubridy Show broadcast on RTÉ Radio 1. Among the competing artists was Brendan Murray, who represented Ireland in the Eurovision Song Contest 2017.

Final 
The final held on 4 February 2022 at the Studio 4 of RTÉ in Dublin, hosted by Ryan Tubridy, with Irish Eurovision commentator Marty Whelan reporting from the green room. It featured commentary from a studio jury panel that consisted of singer-songwriter Caroline Corr, singer Lucia Evans, musician and former contest winner Paul Harrington and presenter Bláthnaid Treacy. The international jury panel consisted of American journalist William Lee Adams, member of  Icelandic representatives Gagnamagnið Árný Fjóla, Czech screenwriter and former Head of Delegation Jan Frost Bors and Russian Head of Delegation Katerina Orlova. During the voting break, the show featured a performance of Riverdance, which was first presented at the Eurovision Song Contest 1994 in Dublin. Following the combination of votes from the studio jury, an international jury and public televoting, "That's Rich" performed by Brooke was selected as the winner.

At Eurovision 
According to Eurovision rules, all nations with the exceptions of the host country and the "Big Five" (France, Germany, Italy, Spain and the United Kingdom) are required to qualify from one of two semi-finals in order to compete for the final; the top ten countries from each semi-final progress to the final. The European Broadcasting Union (EBU) split up the competing countries into six different pots based on voting patterns from previous contests, with countries with favourable voting histories put into the same pot. On 25 January 2022, an allocation draw was held which placed each country into one of the two semi-finals, as well as which half of the show they would perform in. Ireland was placed into the second semi-final, which was held on 12 May 2022, and performed in the second half of the show.

Once all the competing songs for the 2022 contest had been released, the running order for the semi-finals was decided by the shows' producers rather than through another draw, so that similar songs were not placed next to each other.

Voting
Voting during the three shows involved each country awarding two sets of points from 1-8, 10 and 12: one from their professional jury and the other from televoting. Each nation's jury consisted of five music industry professionals who are citizens of the country they represent, with a diversity in gender and age represented. The judges assess each entry based on the performances during the second Dress Rehearsal of each show, which takes place the night before each live show, against a set of criteria including: vocal capacity; the stage performance; the song's composition and originality; and the overall impression by the act. Jury members may only take part in panel once every three years, and are obliged to confirm that they are not connected to any of the participating acts in a way that would impact their ability to vote impartially. Jury members should also vote independently, with no discussion of their vote permitted with other jury members. The exact composition of the professional jury, and the results of each country's jury and televoting were released after the grand final; the individual results from each jury member were also released in an anonymised form.

Points awarded to Ireland

Points awarded by Ireland

Detailed voting results 
The following members comprised the Irish jury:
 Bláthnaid Treacy
 Deirdre Crookes
 Julian Vignoles
 Niamh Kavanagh
 Phillip McMahon

References 

2022
Countries in the Eurovision Song Contest 2022
Eurovision
Eurovision